Regonesi is an Italian surname. Notable people with the surname include:

Mónica Regonesi (born 1961), Chilean long-distance runner
Pierre Giorgio Regonesi (born 1979), Italian footballer

Italian-language surnames